SCMV may refer to:
 Sugarcane mosaic virus
 Molina Viña San Pedro Airport